A horse is a hoofed mammal of the species Equus ferus caballus.

Horse or Horses may also refer to:

Animals
 Equus ferus, or wild horse, the species from which horses were domesticated
 Equus (genus), the horse genus, including donkeys, horses, zebras, and others
 Equinae, the horse subfamily
 Equidae, the horse family

Arts and entertainment

Films
 Horse (1965 film), an underground film directed by Andy Warhol
 Horse (1941 film), a Japanese film directed by Kajiro Yamamoto (and finished by assistant director Akira Kurosawa)
 Horses (film) (Italian: Cavalli), a 2014 Italian drama film

Sports
 H-O-R-S-E, a variation of basketball
 Pommel horse, a gymnastics apparatus
 Vaulting horse, a gymnastics apparatus

Games
 HORSE (poker), a form of poker
 Knight (chess), sometimes called a horse by beginners

Music

Artists
 An Horse, an Australian rock duo
 Horse McDonald, a Scottish singer-songwriter
 Band of Horses, an American rock band known briefly as Horses
 Horse the Band, an American metalcore group
 Horse, American rapper, member of Bravehearts

Albums
 Horses (album), by American Patti Smith

Songs
 "Horse" (song), by Salvatore Ganacci, 2019
 "The Horse", by Cliff Nobles and Company, 1968
 "The Horses", by Rickie Lee Jones, 1989; covered by Daryl Braithwaite, 1990
 "Horse", by Live from Throwing Copper, 1994
 "Horses", by Dala from Everyone Is Someone, 2009
 "Horses", by PnB Rock, Kodak Black, and A Boogie wit da Hoodie from The Fate of the Furious: The Album, 2017
 "Beauty Queen/Horses", by Tori Amos from Boys for Pele, 1996

Fictional characters
 Horse (character), the main character of Centaurworld
 "Horse", a main character of Footrot Flats'

Other arts and entertainment
 "Horses", an episode of the television series Zoboomafoo The Horse (poem), a 1954 poem by Ronald Duncan
 The Horse, a book by William Youatt
 The Horse: Backstreet Choppers, an American motorcycling magazine founded by former employees of Iron Horse''

Geography

Australia
Horse Peninsula, a peninsula in South Australia
Horse Peninsula, a locality which was renamed Little Douglas, South Australia

United States
 Horse Creek (California)
 Horse Creek (Colorado), a tributary of the Arkansas River
 Horse Creek (Tombigbee River), a tributary of the Tombigbee River
 Horse Range (disambiguation), several US mountain ranges

Multiple countries
Horse Island (disambiguation)
Horse Creek (disambiguation)

People
 Horse McDonald (born 1958), Scottish singer-songwriter
 Harry Horse, pen name of Richard Horne (1960-2007), British author, illustrator and political cartoonist
 John Horse (c. 1812–1882), African-American adviser to Osceola and a leader of units fighting against the US during the Seminole Wars
 Michael Horse (born 1951), American actor
 Matt Cain (born 1984), nicknamed The Horse, American baseball pitcher
 Harry Danning (1911–2004), nicknamed Harry the Horse, American baseball player
 Harry B. Liversedge (1894–1951), nicknamed Harry the Horse, United States Marine Corps brigadier general and athlete

Other uses
 Horse (geology), a block of rock completely separated from the surrounding rock
 Horse (zodiac), one of the 12 animals in the Chinese zodiac
 Horse meat, the meat from a horse
 Yakovlev Yak-24 (NATO reporting name: Horse), a Soviet transport helicopter
 Horse, a nickname for the drug heroin
 Horse, a nautical term for a fixture which provides a movable attachment for a rope
 Horse, in the board game shogi, a promoted bishop or "dragon horse"

See also

 
 
 Horse people (disambiguation)
 Horseman (disambiguation)